County Louth was a constituency represented in the Irish House of Commons to 1801.

Members of Parliament
 1370: Roger Gernon, Richard Vernon
 1420: Bartholomew Vernon, Richard Bagot
 1560: Nicholas Taaffe of Ballebragane and Edward Dowdall of Glaspistal 
 1585:  Roger Gerlone (Garland) and William Moore of Barmeath 
 1613–1315: Christopher Verdon de Clonmore and Richard Gernon de Stabanan 
 1634–1635: Sir Christopher Bellew and Christopher Dowdall 
 1639–1642: Christopher Bellew and John Bellew (both expelled)
 1642–1644: Philip, Lord Lisle and Col. Lawrence Crawford (both absent in England without leave)
 1644–1649: Hon Francis Moore and Gerrard Moore
 1659: John Ruxton
 1661–1666: Henry Bellingham and Sir Thomas Stanley

1689–1801

Notes

References

Historic constituencies in County Louth
Constituencies of the Parliament of Ireland (pre-1801)
1800 disestablishments in Ireland
Constituencies disestablished in 1800